= 2005 Academy Awards =

2005 Academy Awards may refer to:

- 77th Academy Awards, the Academy Awards ceremony that took place in 2005
- 78th Academy Awards, the 2006 ceremony honoring the best in film for 2005
